Shay may refer to:

People
Shay is an Irish Gaelic name, a variant of the name Shea. It is derived from Seamus, which is anglicized from Ó Séaghdha. Shay is also a Hebrew unisex name, meaning gift, deriving as a variation of Shai.

Mononym
 Shay (singer), Shay Mooney, of American act "Dan + Shay"
 Shay (rapper), Belgian rapper

Given name
 Shay Bushinsky, Israeli computer programmer

Entertainment industry
 Shay Astar (born 1981), American actress
 Shay Carl (born 1980), American YouTuber
 Shay Haley (born 1975), (presumed) N*E*R*D musician
 Shay Hatten, American screenwriter
 Shay Mitchell (born 1987), Canadian actress
 Shay Roundtree (born 1977), American actor
 Shay Youngblood, American creative writer

Sports 
 Shay Abutbul, Israeli footballer
 Shay Brennan, Irish footballer
 Shay Doron (born 1985), (female) basketball player
 Shay, Seamus Elliott, Irish road bicycle racer
 Shay Gibbons, Irish footballer
 Shay Given, Irish footballer
 Shay Holtzman, Israeli footballer
 Shay Kelly, English footballer
 Shay Keogh, Irish footballer
 Shay Stephenson, Canadian hockey player

Surname
 Anthony Shay, American dancer and choreographer
 Art Shay, American photographer
 Dorothy Shay (1921–1978), American comedic recording artist and actress
 Ephraim Shay (1839–1916), American designer of the Shay locomotive
 Gene Shay, Philadelphia folk music figure
 Jennifer Shay, Canadian academic and ecologist
 Jerry Shay, American football player
 Jonathan Shay, American clinical psychiatrist
 Larry Shay, American songwriter
 Mildred Shay, American film actress
 Normand Shay (1899–1968), Canadian hockey player
 Ryan Shay, American long-distance runner
 Whitney Shay, American blues, soul, and rhythm and blues singer and songwriter

Fictional characters
 Shay, human tribe in the Shadow World RPG campaign setting
 Shay, in Scott Westerfeld's Uglies series of novels
 Shay Bourne, in the novel Change of Heart
 Shay Patrick Cormac, protagonist in the video game Assassin's Creed Rogue
 Carly Shay and Spencer Shay, in American TV series iCarly
 Shay Turner, in Australian–New Zealand TV series 800 Words
 Pearl Shay, in American situation comedy 227
 Leslie Shay, in American TV series Chicago Fire

Transportation
 Shay, alternative spelling for chaise (carriage)
 One-horse shay, a light, covered two-wheeled carriage for two persons
 Shay locomotive, a type of steam locomotive patented and popularized by Ephraim Shay
 Shay Motors Corporation, American automobile company 1978–1982

Other uses
 Shay, Arabic tea
 Shay's Warehouse and Stable, in New Hamburg, New York
 The Shay, Halifax Town F.C. and RLFC venue, England
 Shays' Rebellion, in the United States in the 1780s

See also
 Ó Sé
 O'Shea
 Shai (disambiguation)
 Shays (disambiguation)
 Shea (disambiguation)